Astamur Tania is a former Head of the Presidential Administration of Abkhazia.

Career
On 4 June 2014, following the May 2014 Revolution, Head of the Presidential Administration Beslan Kubrava and Security Council Secretary Nugzar Ashuba resigned, accusing the opposition of carrying out a witch hunt and imposing its decisions on the interim authorities. On 9 June, acting President Valeri Bganba appointed Astamur Tania as acting Head of the Presidential Administration. Tania was permanently appointed on 29 September 2014 by newly elected President Raul Khajimba.

On 6 May 2016, Khajimba accepted Tania's resignation. On 16 May, Tania was succeeded by Gagra District Head Beslan Bartsits.

References

Living people
Heads of the Presidential Administration of Abkhazia
Year of birth missing (living people)
Place of birth missing (living people)